Morteza Gholi Khan (Sani-ol Douleh) (1856–1911) was a leader of the Persian Constitutional Revolution and the first Chairman of the first Majlis. A member of the Hedayat family, he served as the Minister of Finance of Iran for seven months.

Life 
At the time, Persia was being plundered of its resources by the British and Russians who had also obtained taxation rights on all significant sources keeping the county and some of the ruling class under effective financial control. Realizing that a country cannot be independent without self sufficiency and monetary independence, he initiated financial reforms and the overhaul of the taxation system, including bringing in the American adviser W. Morgan Shuster. This and his unwillingness to sell out led to his assassination by the Russians on in February 1911 by two Georgian nationals in Tehran.

References

External links 
 Family background of Morteza Gholi Khan, Sani-ol Douleh

1864 births
1911 deaths
People from Tehran
People of the Persian Constitutional Revolution
Assassinated Iranian politicians
Moderate Socialists Party politicians
Speakers of the National Consultative Assembly
Members of the 1st Iranian Majlis
Deputies of Tehran for National Consultative Assembly
People from Mazandaran Province